Shawn Kenneth MacKenzie (born August 22, 1962) is a Canadian former professional ice hockey goaltender who played a total of 130 minutes during 6 games in the National Hockey League with the New Jersey Devils. He had 15 goals scored against him in those 130 minutes of play, for a Goals Against Average of 6.92.

From 2000 to 2004 he served as head coach of the QMJHL's Halifax Mooseheads. During the 2005 - 2006 season he was head coach of the CEHL's Dartmouth Destroyers.

MacKenzie was born in Bedford, Nova Scotia. Since 2006 he has coached minor hockey in the Bedford Minor Hockey Association.

Career statistics

Regular season and playoffs

References

External links
 

1962 births
Living people
Canadian ice hockey coaches
Canadian ice hockey goaltenders
Colorado Rockies (NHL) draft picks
Halifax Mooseheads coaches
Hershey Bears players
Ice hockey people from Nova Scotia
Kalamazoo Wings (1974–2000) players
Maine Mariners players
New Jersey Devils players
Oshawa Generals players
People from Bedford, Nova Scotia
Sportspeople from Halifax, Nova Scotia
Wichita Wind players
Windsor Spitfires players